USS Geraldine (SP-1011) was a United States Navy patrol vessel in commission from 1917 to 1918.

Geraldine was built in 1916 as the private motorboat Albion by George Lawley & Son at Neponset, Massachusetts. She later was renamed Geraldine.

On 24 July 1917, the U.S. Navy acquired Geraldine from her owner, Frederick S. Fish of South Bend, Indiana, for use as a section patrol boat during World War I. Fish delivered her to the Navy at Chicago, Illinois, on 8 September 1917, and she was commissioned as USS Geraldine (SP-1011) on 13 September 1917 with her owner.

Assigned to the 9th Naval District and based at Great Lakes, Illinois, Geraldine patrolled in Lake Michigan until late in 1917, when she was laid up at Chicago for the winter because of the annual icing over of the Great Lakes. Returning to service on Lake Michigan on 6 April 1918 after the spring thaw, Geraldine resumed her patrol and guard ship duties for the rest of World War I. She also served as a dispatch boat in the Sault Ste, Marie, Michigan, area from 12 May 1918 to 19 August 1918.

Geraldine was stricken from the Navy List on 17 December 1918 and the Navy returned her to Fish on 7 January 1919.

References

SP-1011 Geraldine at Department of the Navy Naval History and Heritage Command Online Library of Selected Images: U.S. Navy Ships -- Listed by Hull Number: "SP" #s and "ID" #s -- World War I Era Patrol Vessels and other Acquired Ships and Craft numbered from SP-1000 through SP-1099
NavSource Online: Section Patrol Craft Photo Archive Geraldine (SP 1011)

Patrol vessels of the United States Navy
World War I patrol vessels of the United States
Ships built in Boston
1916 ships
Great Lakes ships